Yu Si (218 - 271), courtesy name Shihong, was a Chinese military general and politician of the state of Eastern Wu during the Three Kingdoms period of China.

Life
Yu Si was the fourth son of Yu Fan, an official who served under Sun Quan, the founding emperor of Eastern Wu, and under Sun Quan's predecessor, Sun Ce. His ancestral home was in Yuyao County (餘姚縣), Kuaiji Commandery, which is in present-day Yuyao, Zhejiang. However, he was born in Nanhai Commandery (南海郡; around present-day Guangzhou, Guangdong) in Jiao Province because his father was exiled there by Sun Quan for showing disrespect on several occasions. Yu Si was 15 years old when his father died. After Yu Fan's death, Sun Quan freed his family from exile and allowed them to return to Yuyao County and bring Yu's remains back there for burial.

In 258, the Wu regent Sun Chen deposed the emperor Sun Liang and replaced him with Sun Xiu, the Prince of Langya (琅邪王). Before Sun Xiu arrived at the palace for the coronation, Sun Chen wanted to enter the palace first and behaved in a manner as if he was going to usurp the throne. He then summoned the court officials for a meeting. All of them looked fearful except for Yu Si, who appeared calm and composed. Yu Si told Sun Chen: "My lord, you hold an important position in the state just like Yi Yin and the Duke of Zhou in the past. You also wield the authority to depose and enthrone emperors. You will be bringing peace to the spirits of the past rulers and bringing benefits to the people. Everyone is very excited about this. It is as if Yi Yin and Huo Guang have returned from the dead. However, now, you wish to enter the palace before the Prince's arrival. This will cause instability and make everyone feel suspicious of you. This isn't the way for you to establish a good reputation as a loyal and filial subject." Sun Chen felt unhappy after hearing Yu Si's words, but he nonetheless honoured Sun Xiu as the new emperor.

After Sun Xiu ascended the throne, he appointed Yu Si, He Shao, Wang Fan and Xue Ying as Central Regular Mounted Attendants (散騎中常侍)). Later, during Sun Hao's reign, in December 269 or January 270, Yu Si was appointed as an Ambassador-Inspector of the Army (監軍使者) and was ordered to lead Wu forces to attack the Fuyan barbarians (扶嚴夷). For his success in the campaign, he was promoted to Champion General (冠軍將軍), appointed as the Inspector (刺史) of Jiao Province, and enfeoffed as the Marquis of Yuyao (餘姚侯). He died of illness in an unknown year, but it is likely that he died soon after his appointment as Inspector of Jiao Province.

Family
Yu Si had 10 brothers. Among them, the notable ones were his fifth brother Yu Zhong, sixth brother Yu Song, and eighth brother Yu Bing.

See also
 Lists of people of the Three Kingdoms

Notes

References

 Chen, Shou (3rd century). Records of the Three Kingdoms (Sanguozhi).
 
 Pei, Songzhi (5th century). Annotations to Records of the Three Kingdoms (Sanguozhi zhu).
 

218 births
Year of death unknown
Eastern Wu generals
Eastern Wu politicians
Politicians from Guangzhou
Politicians from Ningbo